Stathmopoda crocophanes is a moth of the Stathmopodidae family. It is found in Australia in the states of New South Wales, Queensland, South Australia, Tasmania and Western Australia.

The wingspan is about 0.4 in (10 mm). Adults are yellow with two broad dark brown triangles on each forewing. The hindwings are dark brown with yellow tips. The inner margin of each wing has a hairy fringe wider than the wing itself.

The larvae live in dead leaf litter. They feed on dead leaf litter from various plants, including  Eucalyptus species.

Taxonomy
Some authors treat it as a synonym of Stathmopoda auriferella.

External links
Australian Insects
Australian Faunal Directory

Stathmopodidae
Moths described in 1897
Moths of Australia
Taxa named by Edward Meyrick